Centris elegans is a bee species in the genus Centris found on Saint Vincent and Grenadines.

See also
 Frederick Smith (entomologist)

References

External links 
Centris elegans at www.discoverlife.org

Apinae
Insects described in 1874